Nelson Alexander Gray (May 20, 1911 – October 10, 1982) was an American weight thrower. He had his best achievements in the shot put, in 1932, when he placed second at the AAU championships and fifth at the Summer Olympics; that year he was ranked eighth in the world. Gray lived most of his life in Upland, California, and owned a citrus grove there.

References

1911 births
1982 deaths
Athletes (track and field) at the 1932 Summer Olympics
American male shot putters
Olympic track and field athletes of the United States